Gilmar "Kid" Nascimento Teixeira (born 30 October 1970) is a former Brazilian male volleyball player. He was part of the Brazil men's national volleyball team, and competed in the 2000 Summer Olympics in Sydney, Australia, finishing 6th.

See also
 Brazil at the 2000 Summer Olympics

References

External links
 

1970 births
Living people
Brazilian men's volleyball players
Place of birth missing (living people)
Volleyball players at the 2000 Summer Olympics
Olympic volleyball players of Brazil
Sportspeople from Porto Alegre